Turnaround: Crisis, Leadership, and the Olympic Games is a 2004 book written by Governor of Massachusetts Mitt Romney with the acknowledged assistance of Timothy Robinson. The book tells the account of the scandal and turnaround of the 2002 Winter Olympics in Salt Lake City.

A paperback edition was released in 2007.

American non-fiction books
2004 non-fiction books
Works by Mitt Romney
2002 Winter Olympics
Olympic Games books
Regnery Publishing books
Collaborative non-fiction books